Tortyra chalcodes is a moth of the family Choreutidae. It is known from Costa Rica and Mexico.

References

Tortyra
Moths described in 1914